Adam Leonard D'Apuzzo (born 20 October 1986) is a retired Australian association football player who played as a left-back. He retired from professional football following his release from Western Sydney Wanderers.

Biography
He has previously played for the Marconi Stallions in the NSW Premier League competition. D'Apuzzo's brother is former Central Coast Mariners midfielder David D'Apuzzo. D'Apuzzo attended Trinity Grammar School in Summer Hill, Sydney, Australia with his brother and former Sydney FC striker Ben Vidaic. He was the captain of the football team. D'Apuzzo also studies commerce, majoring in finance and accounting, at the University of NSW.

Newcastle Jets
He signed a contract with the Newcastle Jets in 2006. He made his debut for the first team squad on 1 September 2006 against the Queensland Roar at Energy Australia Stadium. In his first season, he played 11 games and scored 1 goal. He became a regular at left back. On 18 February 2011 it was announced that he would leave the club and return to his home town of Sydney. He played over 102 games for the Jets over 5 years with the club. He trialed with Sydney FC on his return to Sydney.

APIA Leichhardt
On 20 June 2011, it was announced that he had signed for APIA Leichhardt Tigers in the NSW Premier League until the remainder of the 2011 season.

Western Sydney Wanderers
D'Apuzzo had effectively retired from professional football, deciding to concentrate on his accounting career, when Tony Popovic offered D'Apuzzo a contract with the newly formed Western Sydney Wanderers. D'Apuzzo earned the starting left fullback position and established himself in the starting 11.

In 2014, he left the Wanderers after not agreeing to terms in a new contractual offer made by the Wanderers in December 2014. Within his two seasons at the club, he made a total of 49 appearances.

A-League career statistics 

1 - AFC Champions League statistics are included in season ending during group stages (i.e. ACL 2009 and A-League season 2008–2009 etc.)

Honours 
With Newcastle Jets:
   A-League Championship: 2007–2008

References

External links
 Western Sydney Wanderers profile
 FFA – Olyroos profile

1986 births
Australian soccer players
Australian people of Italian descent
A-League Men players
Western Sydney Wanderers FC players
Newcastle Jets FC players
Marconi Stallions FC players
People educated at Trinity Grammar School (New South Wales)
New South Wales Institute of Sport alumni
Living people
Association football fullbacks